Barrhead High School is a secondary school in Barrhead, East Renfrewshire. The school is over forty years old. Fiona Johnston is the current headmistress, appointed in June-Aug 2020.

Associated primary schools 
Also known as "feeder" schools, they include:
 Cross Arthurlie Primary School
 Carlibar Primary School
 Hillview Primary School

Notable alumni
 Thomas Elder Dickson, artist
 Gregor Fisher, actor
 Douglas Henshall, actor
 Allison McGourty, arts executive
 Alex McLeish, football manager

References

External links
Barrhead High School's page on Scottish Schools Online
Barrhead High School's most recent HMIe report

Secondary schools in East Renfrewshire
1967 establishments in Scotland
Educational institutions established in 1967
Barrhead